Louise Dannemann Eriksen (born 11 September 1995) is a Danish footballer who plays as a defender for Elitedivisionen club Kolding IF, for which she serves as captain.

International career
Eriksen appeared for the Denmark national under-16 team in 2011. She was selected for an international friendly match with the Danish national team against Finland in April 2017. She hasn't made an official debut for the Denmark or been part of the team since.

Personal life
Eriksen is the younger sister of the Danish international footballer Christian Eriksen.

References

External links
Profile at Danish Football Association 
 
 

1995 births
Living people
Danish women's footballers
Denmark women's international footballers
Women's association football defenders
People from Kolding
Sportspeople from the Region of Southern Denmark